Banshipur village is located in Shahpur block of Bhojpur district of Bihar. It has a total of 154 families and a population of 1220. There are several communities, but the Bhumihar Brahmins are a majority. Other castes include Yadav (OBC), Bania (OBC), and Dusadh (SC). The nearest market, bus stand, banks, and high school are approximately at 600m in Karnamepur Bazaar. It has only one primary school.

The nearest villages are Mahuar (West), Karnamepur (East), Dalan Chhapra (South), and Dilmanpur (North).  The nearest railway station is Banahi.

Administration
Banshipur village is administered by Gram Pradhan through its Gram Panchayat, who is elected representative of village as per constitution of India and Panchyati Raj Act.

References

External links
Villages in Bhojpur, Bihar 

Villages in Bhojpur district, India